CUNP may refer to:
 Certified Urologic Nurse Practitioner, see Nursing credentials and certifications
 Chinese Union Version with New Punctuation, an updated Chinese translation of Bible